Ginny Holder is an actress best known for playing Thandie Abebe-Griffin on the BBC medical drama series Holby City.

Her parents were born in Guyana and Barbados. In 2022 she joined as a regular on Death in Paradise as Darlene Curtis.

Filmography

References

External links

Living people
English people of Barbadian descent
English people of Guyanese descent
Black British actresses
English television actresses
Year of birth missing (living people)
20th-century British actresses
21st-century British actresses
English film actresses
20th-century English women
20th-century English people
21st-century English women
21st-century English people